Hindu Mela was a political and cultural festival started in 1867 in Calcutta. Its primary objective was to instill a sense of national pride among the city-dwellers to indigenous handmade products rather than imported British-made products. It included the display of swadeshi wrestling, swadeshi art and recital and performances of swadeshi poetry and songs. The mela met regularly until 1880 after which it lost its importance due to the establishment of other institutions.

Founding 
In 1867, the National Paper published the Prospectus of a Society for the Promotion of National Feeling among the Educated Natives of Bengal by Rajnarayan Basu. Inspired by this booklet Nabagopal Mitra founded the Hindu Mela and the National Society in 1867.  The mela was first known as the Chaitra Mela. The founding of the mela was supported financially by the Tagore family of Jorashako. Members of the Tagore family recited poetry and performed songs at the event.

Later years 
Satyendranath Tagore was deeply associated with the Hindu Mela. He was not present in the founding session of the Hindu Mela held in April 1867 as he was in western India. However, he was present for the second session. He composed a song "mile sabe Bharat santan, ektan gaho gaan" (unite, India's children, sing in unison), which was hailed as the first national anthem of India.

Despite being too young to participate during the founding years of the mela, Rabindranath Tagore quickly became deeply involved in the mela. It was here that he got first exposed to anti-British sentiments which shaped his beliefs later in life. On the tenth anniversary of the mela, Rabindranath Tagore recited a poem attacking the then newly appointed Viceroy Lord Lytton's decision to hold a lavish Durbar in Delhi where Queen Victoria was proclaimed the "Empress of India" all while a famine raged across the country. This was among his first acts of publicly attacking the British Raj.

Several organisers of the Hindu Mela came together to form a secret society, Sanjivani Sabha which manufactured swadeshi matchsticks and cloth woven in swadeshi looms.

The Hindu Mela also provided sufficient exposure to indigenous physical sports. In the first session of the mela, renowned wrestlers in the city were invited and felicated. In the following session, competitions for indigenous physical sports such as lathi-play and wrestling were organized. In 1874, when the fifth session of the mela was held, tickets for muscle-posing shows sold at a rate of 50 paise. As a result of this exposure, many schools introduced physical education into their curriculum. Physical education was also included into the syllabus of Indian Civil Service examinations.

References

Further reading 

 
 

Bengal Renaissance
Bengali culture
History of Kolkata
Culture of West Bengal
19th century in India